The Science of Mind is a book by Ernest Holmes. It proposes a science with a new relationship between humans and God. The book was originally published by Holmes, the founder of Religious Science, in 1926. A revised version was completed by Holmes and Maude Allison Lathem and published 12 years later in 1938.

Holmes' writing details how people can actively engage their minds in creating change throughout their lives. The book includes explanations of how to pray and meditate, find self-confidence, and express love.

Influences 
Holmes wrote The Science of Mind with the belief that he was summarizing the best of beliefs from around the world. His influences included Thomas Troward, Ralph Waldo Emerson, Christian Larson, Phineas Quimby, and Emma Curtis Hopkins.

See also 
 Centers for Spiritual Living

References

External links 
 Holmes, E. (1926) The Original Science of Mind. Books to borrow via the Internet Archive.

Religious Science
New Thought literature
Books about spirituality
1926 non-fiction books